George Edward Pope (born December 24, 1973) is an American former soccer player who last played for Real Salt Lake of Major League Soccer and spent eleven years as a defender for the United States national team. He spent most of his career playing for D.C. United. Pope is a member of the National Soccer Hall of Fame.

Youth
Born in High Point, North Carolina, Pope attended Southwest Guilford High School. Pope had a very successful career playing for the North Carolina Tar Heels where he also kicked for Mack Brown's football team.  In 1994, he was a first-team All-American, and also earned All-ACC and All-South Region honors.

Professional club career
In 1996, D.C. United selected Pope in the first round (second overall) in the MLS College Draft.  His first season in Washington, D.C. was split between United and the men's Olympic team, which was preparing for the 1996 Summer Olympics in Atlanta.  However, he still played 18 games for United and won a league title with the team, scoring a golden goal in the first-ever MLS Cup against the Los Angeles Galaxy.  He also played his first game with the national team, helping the team beat Trinidad and Tobago 2–0 on November 10 that year.

In 1997, Pope made quite a splash on the MLS scene.  He was named MLS Defender of the Year and earned a place in the MLS Best XI, as well as winning a second MLS title.  In 1998, Pope helped United win both the CONCACAF Champions Cup and the InterAmerican Cup, the first continental honors earned by an MLS team.  He scored the winning goal in United's victory in the Interamerican Cup.

Pope's 1999 season was beset by injuries, and his playing time was limited, which continued to pester him into 2000, although he would play 19 and 21 games, respectively, in those seasons, and he earned his third and fourth consecutive trips to the MLS All-Star Game. Injuries continued to dog Pope in 2001, but he again played in the All-Star Game and also played an important role in the national team's World Cup qualification.  His injuries continued into the 2002 MLS season, and he only appeared in seventeen matches.

On December 23, 2002, Pope was traded to the MetroStars, along with Jaime Moreno and Richie Williams, in return for Mike Petke, a first-round draft pick, and an allocation. Pope continued his quality play with the MetroStars, captaining the team to an excellent defensive record. He was named to the MLS Best XI for the third time for his efforts. In 2004, he had a down year with the Metros, but was still voted to the MLS Best XI for a second consecutive season. After the year, Pope was traded to expansion Salt Lake for an allocation. He played three seasons with Real Salt Lake, providing veteran leadership for the expansion franchise.  In 2007, he retired from professional soccer.  In ten years in MLS, he scored nine goals and ten assists, plus added that MLS Cup goal and an assist in the playoffs. In 2005, he was named to the MLS All-Time Best XI.

On June 14, 2007, Pope announced his plans to retire from all competitive soccer at the end of the 2007 season, saying: "It's just time...You get up in the morning and you're in pain. Before practice, you are in pain. And after practice you are still in pain."

On March 11, 2011, he was selected for induction into the National Soccer Hall of Fame.

International career
Pope began his international career with the United States men's national soccer team on November 10, 1996, in a World Cup qualifier against Trinidad and Tobago.  At the time, he was in his rookie season with D.C. United.  He quickly became a fixture for the national team, which surprised the world when it defeated Brazil 1-0 and made its way to the finals of the CONCACAF Gold Cup. Pope also played in two games for the disappointing U.S. campaign at the 1998 FIFA World Cup. In 2002, he started all five U.S. matches in the World Cup, and played a big part in the surprising success of the United States in that tournament. In 2006, Pope was part of the U.S. team that participated in the 2006 FIFA World Cup. In the second match against Italy, he received a red card which caused him to miss the third match against Ghana, the last of his team at the tournament.

Pope started every game he played with the national team. On August 3, 2006, Pope announced his retirement from international soccer. His international career included 82 caps and 8 goals over an eleven-year period.

Post playing career
Pope served as the director of player relations for the MLS Players Union following his playing retirement. In 2015, Pope left the MLS Players Union to work at the Octagon sports agency.

Career statistics

Club

International goals

Honors
DC United
 MLS Cup: 1996, 1997, 1999
 Supporters' Shield: 1997, 1999
 U.S. Open Cup: 1996
 CONCACAF Champions League: 1998
 Copa Interamericana: 1998

United States
 CONCACAF Gold Cup: 2005

Individual
 MLS Best XI: 1997, 1998, 2003, 2004
 MLS Defender of the Year: 1997
 National Soccer Hall of Fame 2011 Inductee

References

External links

Eddie Pope: His Holiness - Profile on Total Soccer Show

1973 births
Living people
Sportspeople from Greensboro, North Carolina
Soccer players from North Carolina
African-American soccer players
American soccer players
Association football defenders
North Carolina Tar Heels football players
North Carolina Tar Heels men's soccer players
All-American men's college soccer players
D.C. United draft picks
D.C. United players
New York Red Bulls players
Real Salt Lake players
Major League Soccer players
Major League Soccer All-Stars
National Soccer Hall of Fame members
United States men's under-23 international soccer players
Olympic soccer players of the United States
United States men's international soccer players
Footballers at the 1996 Summer Olympics
1998 CONCACAF Gold Cup players
1998 FIFA World Cup players
2000 CONCACAF Gold Cup players
2002 FIFA World Cup players
2005 CONCACAF Gold Cup players
2006 FIFA World Cup players
CONCACAF Gold Cup-winning players